Anchuruli tunnel is a 5.5-kilometer tunnel carved through a single continuous granite to connect water from Irattayar to Anchuruli Idukki Reservoir on Kalyanathand Hill. It's located at Anchuruli in Kerala.

The tunnel was constructed from 10 March 1974 to 10 January 1980 on Contract by Pyli Pilla. The tunnel has a diameter of 24 feet. Twenty-two people died during the construction of the tunnel.

References

Water tunnels in India
Buildings and structures in Kerala
Tunnels completed in 1980
1980 establishments in Kerala
Idukki district